The 1972–73 Hellenic Football League season was the 20th in the history of the Hellenic Football League, a football competition in England.

Premier Division

The Premier Division featured 15 clubs which competed in the division last season, along with two new clubs:
Chipping Norton Town, promoted from Division One B
Fairford Town, promoted from Division One A

League table

Division One

The Division One featured 16 clubs, including 14 clubs from the previous season's Division One A and Division One B and 2 clubs relegated from the Premier Division: 

Clubs relegated from the Premier Division:
Cirencester Town
Buckingham Athletic

Clubs transferred from Division One A:
Burnham
Ernest Turners Sports
Thatcham
Long Wittenham
Swindon Town 'A'
Hazells
MG Athletic 

Clubs transferred from Division One B:
Rivet Sports 
Waddesdon
Princes Risborough Town
Kidlington
Garsington
Oxford University Press
AC Delco

League table

Division Two

The Division Two featured 11 clubs, including 8 clubs relegated from the previous season's Division One A and Division One B and 3 clubs joined Division Two: 

Clubs relegated from Division One A:
Abingdon United
Marston United
Easington Sports

Clubs relegated from Division One B:
Watlington 
Maidenhead Social
Aston Clinton
Stokenchurch
A G R G Harwell

Clubs joined Division Two:
The 61 FC Luton
Walcot
Wroughton

League table

References

External links
 Hellenic Football League

1972-73
H